Michael May (born April 29, 1999) is an American actor and model. He is known for playing Chuck Scolnik in The WB/CW drama series One Tree Hill (2008–12) and Simon Spry on the Netflix series Sweet Magnolias (2020–present).

Filmography

Film

Television

Discography
The following is a list of albums and songs by Michael May that has been recorded.

Singles

References

1999 births
Living people